The Universal Decimal Classification (UDC) is a bibliographic and library classification representing the systematic arrangement of all branches of human knowledge organized as a coherent system in which knowledge fields are related and inter-linked. The UDC is an analytico-synthetic and faceted classification system featuring detailed vocabulary and syntax that enables powerful content indexing and information retrieval in large collections. Since 1991, the UDC has been owned and managed by the UDC Consortium, a non-profit international association of publishers with headquarters in The Hague, Netherlands.

Unlike other library classification schemes that have started their life as national systems, the UDC was conceived and maintained as an international scheme. Its translation into other languages started at the beginning of the 20th century and has since been published in various printed editions in over 40 languages. UDC Summary, an abridged Web version of the scheme, is available in over 50 languages. The classification has been modified and extended over the years to cope with increasing output in all areas of human knowledge, and is still under continuous review to take account of new developments.

Albeit originally designed as an indexing and retrieval system, due to its logical structure and scalability, UDC has become one of the most widely used knowledge organization systems in libraries, where it is used for either shelf arrangement, content indexing or both. UDC codes can describe any type of document or object to any desired level of detail. These can include textual documents and other media such as films, video and sound recordings, illustrations, maps as well as realia such as museum objects.

History 

The UDC was developed by the Belgian bibliographers Paul Otlet and Henri La Fontaine at the end of the 19th century. In 1895, they created the Universal Bibliographic Repertory (Répertoire Bibliographique Universel) (RBU) which was intended to become a comprehensive classified index to all published information. The idea that the RBU should take the form of a card catalogue came from the young American zoologist Herbert Haviland Field, who was at the time himself setting up a bibliographical agency in Zurich, the Concilium Bibliographicum. A means of arranging the entries would be needed, and Otlet, having heard of the Dewey Decimal Classification, wrote to Melvil Dewey and obtained permission to translate it into French. The idea outgrew the plan of mere translation, and a number of radical innovations were made, adapting the purely enumerative classification (in which all the subjects envisaged are already listed and coded) into one which allows for synthesis (that is, the construction of compound numbers to denote interrelated subjects that could never be exhaustively foreseen); various possible relations between subjects were identified, and symbols assigned to represent them. In its first edition in French "Manuel du Répertoire bibliographique universel" (1905), the UDC already included many features that were revolutionary in the context of knowledge classifications: tables of generally applicable (aspect-free) concepts—called common auxiliary tables; a series of special auxiliary tables with specific but re-usable attributes in a particular field of knowledge; an expressive notational system with connecting symbols and syntax rules to enable coordination of subjects and the creation of a documentation language proper.

The Universal Bibliographic Repertory itself has developed into a remarkable information resource. In the period before World War I it grew to more than eleven million records. The catalogue and its content organized by UDC can still be seen in Mundaneum in Mons, Belgium (in 2013 recommended for inclusion in the UNESCO Memory of the World Register).

The application of UDC 

UDC is used in around 150,000 libraries in 130 countries and in many bibliographical services which require detailed content indexing. In a number of countries it is the main classification system for information exchange and is used in all types of libraries: public, school, academic and special libraries.

UDC is also used in national bibliographies of around 30 countries. Examples of large databases indexed by UDC include: 
 NEBIS (The Network of Libraries and Information Centers in Switzerland) — 2.6 million records
 COBIB.SI (Slovenian National Union Catalogue) — 3.5 million records
 Hungarian National Union Catalogue (MOKKA) — 2.9 million records
 VINITI RAS database (All-Russian Scientific and Technical Information Institute of Russian Academy of Science) with 28 million records
 Meteorological & Geoastrophysical Abstracts (MGA) with 600 journal titles
 PORBASE (Portuguese National Bibliography) with 1.5 million records

UDC has traditionally been used for the indexing of scientific articles which was an important source of information of scientific output in the period predating electronic publishing. Collections of research articles in many countries covering decades of scientific output contain UDC codes.  Examples of journal articles indexed by UDC:
UDC code 663.12:57.06 in the article "Yeast Systematics: from Phenotype to Genotype" in the  journal Food Technology and Biotechnology
UDC code 37.037:796.56, provided in the article "The game method as means of interface of technical-tactical and psychological preparation in sports orienteering" in the Russian journal "Pedagogico-psychological and medico-biological problems of the physical culture and sport" .
UDC code 621.715:621.924:539.3 in the article Residual Stress in Shot-Peened Sheets of AIMg4.5Mn Alloy - in the journal Materials and technology.

The design of UDC lends itself to machine readability, and the system has been used both with early automatic mechanical sorting devices, and modern library OPACs. Since 1993, a standard version of UDC has been maintained and distributed in a database format: UDC Master Reference File (UDC MRF) which is updated and released regularly. The 2011 version of the MRF (released in 2012) contains over 70,000 classes. In the past full printed editions used to have around 220,000 subdivisions.

UDC structure

Notation 
A notation is a code commonly used in classification schemes to represent a class, i.e. a subject and its position in the hierarchy, to enable mechanical sorting and filing of subjects. UDC uses Arabic numerals arranged decimally. Every number is thought of as a decimal fraction with the initial decimal point omitted, which determines the filing order. An advantage of decimal notational systems is that they are infinitely extensible, and when new subdivisions are introduced, they need not disturb the existing allocation of numbers. For ease of reading, a UDC notation is usually punctuated after every third digit:

In UDC the notation has two features that make the scheme easier to browse and work with: 
 hierarchically expressive – the longer the notation, the more specific the class: removing the final digit automatically produces a broader class code.
 syntactically expressive – when UDC codes are combined, the sequence of digits is interrupted by a precise type of punctuation sign which indicates that the expression is a combination of classes rather than a simple class e.g. the colon in 34:32 indicates that there are two distinct notational elements: 34 Law. Jurisprudence and 32 Politics; the closing and opening parentheses and double quotes in the following code 913(574.22)"19"(084.3) indicate four separate notational elements: 913 Regional geography, (574.22) North Kazakhstan (Soltüstik Qazaqstan); "19" 20th century and (084.3) Maps (document form)

Basic features and syntax 
UDC is an analytico-synthetic and faceted classification. It allows an unlimited combination of attributes of a subject and relationships between subjects to be expressed. UDC codes from different tables can be combined to present various aspects of document content and form, e.g. 94(410)"19"(075) History (main subject) of United Kingdom (place) in 20th century (time), a textbook (document form). Or: 37:2 Relationship between Education and Religion. Complex UDC expressions can be accurately parsed into constituent elements.

UDC is also a disciplinary classification covering the entire universe of knowledge. This type of classification can also be described as aspect or perspective, which means that concepts are subsumed and placed under the field in which they are studied. Thus, the same concept can appear in different fields of knowledge. This particular feature is usually implemented in UDC by re-using the same concept in various combinations with the main subject, e.g. a code for language in common auxiliaries of language is used to derive numbers for ethnic grouping, individual languages in linguistics and individual literatures. Or, a code from the auxiliaries of place, e.g. (410) United Kingdom, uniquely representing the concept of United Kingdom can be used to express 911(410) Regional geography of United Kingdom and 94(410) History of United Kingdom.

Organization of classes 

Concepts are organized in two kinds of tables in UDC:

Common auxiliary tables (including certain auxiliary signs). These tables contain facets of concepts representing general recurrent characteristics, applicable over a range of subjects throughout the main tables, including notions such as place, language of the text and physical form of the document, which may occur in almost any subject. UDC numbers from these tables, called common auxiliaries are simply added at the end of the number for the subject taken from the main tables. There are over 15,000 common auxiliaries in UDC.
The main tables or main schedules containing the various disciplines and branches of knowledge are arranged in 9 main classes, numbered from 0 to 9 (with class 4 being vacant). At the beginning of each class there are also series of special auxiliaries, which express aspects that are recurrent within this specific class. Main tables in UDC contain more than 60,000 subdivisions.

Main classes 
0 Science and Knowledge. Organization. Computer Science. Information Science. Documentation. Librarianship. Institutions. Publications
1 Philosophy. Psychology
2 Religion. Theology
3 Social Sciences
4 vacant
5 Mathematics. Natural Sciences
6 Applied Sciences. Medicine, Technology
7 The Arts. Entertainment. Sport
8 Linguistics. Literature
9 Geography. History

The vacant class 4 is the result of a planned schedule expansion. This class was freed by moving linguistics into class 8 in the 1960s to make space for future developments in the rapidly expanding fields of knowledge; primarily natural sciences and technology.

Common auxiliary tables 
Common auxiliaries are aspect-free concepts that can be used in combination with any other UDC code from the main classes or with other common auxiliaries. They have unique notational representations that makes them stand out in complex expressions. Common auxiliary numbers always begin with a certain symbol known as a facet indicator, e.g. = (equal sign) always introduces concepts representing the language of a document; (0...) numbers enclosed in parentheses starting with zero always represent a concept designating document form. Thus (075) Textbook and =111 English can be combined to express, e.g.(075)=111 Textbooks in English, and when combined with numbers from the main UDC tables they can be used as follows: 2(075)=111 Religion textbooks in English, 51(075)=111 Mathematics textbooks in English etc.

=...	Common auxiliaries of language. Table 1c
(0...)	Common auxiliaries of form. Table 1d
(1/9)	Common auxiliaries of place. Table 1e
(=...)	Common auxiliaries of human ancestry, ethnic grouping and nationality. Table 1f
"..."	Common auxiliaries of time. Table 1g helps to make minute division of time e.g.:  "1993-1996"
-0...	Common auxiliaries of general characteristics: Properties, Materials, Relations/Processes and Persons. Table 1k.
-02	Common auxiliaries of properties. Table 1k
-03	Common auxiliaries of materials. Table 1k
-04	Common auxiliaries of relations, processes and operations. Table 1k
-05	Common auxiliaries of persons and personal characteristics. Table 1k this table is repeated

Connecting signs 
In order to preserve the precise meaning and enable accurate parsing of complex UDC expressions, a number of connecting symbols are made available to relate and extend UDC numbers. These are:

UDC outline 

UDC classes in this outline are taken from the Multilingual Universal Decimal Classification Summary (UDCC Publication No. 088) released by the UDC Consortium under the Creative Commons Attribution Share Alike 3.0 license (first release 2009, subsequent update 2012).

Main tables

0 Science and knowledge. Organization. Computer science. Information. Documentation. Librarianship. Institution. Publications

  00          Prolegomena. Fundamentals of knowledge and culture. Propaedeutics
  001         Science and knowledge in general. Organization of intellectual work
  002         Documentation. Books. Writings. Authorship
  003         Writing systems and scripts
  004         Computer science and technology. Computing
  004.2       Computer architecture
  004.3       Computer hardware
  004.4       Software
  004.5       Human-computer interaction
  004.6       Data
  004.7       Computer communication
  004.8       Artificial intelligence
  004.9       Application-oriented computer-based techniques
  005         Management
  005.1       Management Theory
  005.2       Management agents. Mechanisms. Measures
  005.3       Management activities
  005.5       Management operations. Direction
  005.6       Quality management. Total quality management (TQM)
  005.7       Organizational management (OM)
  005.9       Fields of management
  005.92      Records management
  005.93      Plant management. Physical resources management
  005.94      Knowledge management
  005.95/.96  Personnel management. Human Resources management
  006         Standardization of products, operations, weights, measures and time
  007         Activity and organizing. Information. Communication and control theory generally (cybernetics)
  008         Civilization. Culture. Progress   
  01          Bibliography and bibliographies. Catalogues
  02          Librarianship
  030         General reference works (as subject)
  050         Serial publications, periodicals (as subject)
  06          Organizations of a general nature
  069         Museums
  070         Newspapers (as subject). The Press. Outline of journalism
  08          Polygraphies. Collective works (as subject)
  09          Manuscripts. Rare and remarkable works (as subject)

1 Philosophy. Psychology
  101        Nature and role of philosophy
  11         Metaphysics
  111        General metaphysics. Ontology
  122/129    Special Metaphysics
  13         Philosophy of mind and spirit. Metaphysics of spiritual life
  14         Philosophical systems and points of view
  141        Kinds  of viewpoint. Including:  Monism. Dualism. Pluralism. Ontological Materialism. Metaphysical Idealism. Platonism, etc.
  159.9      Psychology
  159.91     Psychophysiology (physiological psychology). Mental physiology
  159.92     Mental development and capacity. Comparative psychology
  159.93     Sensation. Sensory perception
  159.94     Executive functions
  159.95     Higher mental processes
  159.96     Special mental states and processes
  159.97     Abnormal psychology
  159.98     Applied psychology (psychotechnology) in general
  16         Logic. Epistemology. Theory of knowledge. Methodology of logic
  17         Moral philosophy. Ethics. Practical philosophy

2 Religion. Theology

The UDC tables for religion are fully faceted. Indicated in italics below, are special auxiliary numbers that can be used to express attributes (facets) of any specific faith. Any special number can be combined with any religion e.g.  -5 Worship can be used to express e.g. 26-5 Worship in Judaism, 27-5 Worship in Christianity, 24-5 Worship in Buddhism. The complete special auxiliary tables contain around 2000 subdivisions of various attributes that can be attached to express various aspects of individual faiths to a great level of specificity allowing equal level of detail for every religion.
  2-1/-9	Special auxiliary subdivision for religion
  2-1	Theory and philosophy of religion. Nature of religion. Phenomenon of religion
  2-2	Evidences of religion
  2-3	Persons in religion
  2-4	Religious activities. Religious practice
  2-5	Worship broadly. Cult. Rites and ceremonies
  2-6	Processes in religion
  2-7	Religious organization and administration
  2-8	Religions characterised by various properties
  2-9	History of the faith, religion, denomination or church
  21/29	Religious systems. Religions and faiths
  21	Prehistoric and primitive religions
  22	Religions originating in the Far East
  23	Religions originating in Indian sub-continent. Hindu religion in the broad sense
  24	Buddhism
  25	Religions of antiquity. Minor cults and religions
  26	Judaism
  27	Christianity
  28	Islam
  29	Modern spiritual movements

3 Social sciences

  303   Methods of the social sciences
  304	Social questions. Social practice. Cultural practice. Way of life (Lebensweise)
  305	Gender studies
  308	Sociography. Descriptive studies of society (both qualitative and quantitative)
  311	Statistics as a science. Statistical theory
  314/316 Society
  314	Demography. Population studies
  316	Sociology
  32	Politics
  33	Economics. Economic science
  34	Law. Jurisprudence
  35	Public administration. Government. Military affairs
  36	Safeguarding the mental and material necessities of life
  37	Education
  39	Cultural anthropology. Ethnography. Customs. Manners. Traditions. Way of life

4 Currently Vacant

This section is currently vacant.

5 Mathematics. Natural sciences
  502/504  Environmental science. Conservation of natural resources. Threats to the environment and protection against them
  502	The environment and its protection
  504	Threats to the environment
  51	Mathematics
  510	Fundamental and general considerations of mathematics
  511	Number theory
  512	Algebra
  514	Geometry
  517	Analysis
  519.1	Combinatorial analysis. Graph theory
  519.2	Probability. Mathematical statistics
  519.6	Computational mathematics. Numerical analysis
  519.7	Mathematical cybernetics
  519.8	Operational research (OR): mathematical theories and methods
  52	Astronomy. Astrophysics. Space research. Geodesy
  53	Physics
  531/534  Mechanics
  535	Optics
  536	Heat. Thermodynamics. Statistical physics
  537	Electricity. Magnetism. Electromagnetism
  538.9	Condensed matter physics. Solid state physics
  539	Physical nature of matter
  54	Chemistry. Crystallography. Mineralogy
  542	Practical laboratory chemistry. Preparative and experimental chemistry
  543	Analytical chemistry
  544	Physical chemistry
  546	Inorganic chemistry
  547	Organic chemistry
  548/549 Mineralogical sciences. Crystallography. Mineralogy
  55	Earth sciences. Geological sciences
  56	Paleontology
  57	Biological sciences in general
  58	Botany
  59	Zoology

6 Applied sciences. Medicine. Technology

Class 6 occupies the largest proportion of UDC schedules. It contains over 44,000 subdivisions. Each specific field of technology or industry usually contains more than one special auxiliary table with concepts needed to express operations, processes, materials and products. As a result, UDC codes are often created through the combination of various attributes. Equally, some parts of this class enumerate concepts to a great level of detail e.g.  621.882.212 Hexagon screws with additional shapes. Including: Flank screws. Collar screws. Cap screws

  60    Biotechnology
  61	Medical sciences
  611/612 Human biology
  613	Hygiene generally. Personal health and hygiene
  614	Public health and hygiene. Accident prevention
  615	Pharmacology. Therapeutics. Toxicology
  616	Pathology. Clinical medicine
  617	Surgery. Orthopaedics. Ophthalmology
  618	Gynaecology. Obstetrics
  62	Engineering. Technology in general
  620	Materials testing. Commercial materials. Power stations. Economics of energy
  621	Mechanical engineering in general. Nuclear technology. Electrical engineering. Machinery
  622	Mining
  623	Military engineering
  624	Civil and structural engineering in general
  625	Civil engineering of land transport. Railway engineering. Highway engineering
  626/627  Hydraulic engineering and construction. Water (aquatic) structures
  629	Transport vehicle engineering
  63	Agriculture and related sciences and techniques. Forestry. Farming. Wildlife exploitation
  630	Forestry
  631/635	Farm management. Agronomy. Horticulture
  633/635	Horticulture in general. Specific crops
  636	Animal husbandry and breeding in general. Livestock rearing. Breeding of domestic animals
  64	Home economics. Domestic science. Housekeeping
  65	Communication and transport industries. Accountancy. Business management. Public relations
  654	Telecommunication and telecontrol (organization, services)
  655	Graphic industries. Printing. Publishing. Book trade
  656	Transport and postal services. Traffic organization and control
  657	Accountancy
  658	Business management, administration. Commercial organization
  659	Publicity. Information work. Public relations
  66	Chemical technology. Chemical and related industries
  67	Various industries, trades and crafts
  68	Industries, crafts and trades for finished or assembled articles
  69	Building (construction) trade. Building materials. Building practice and procedure

7 The arts. Recreation. Entertainment. Sport
  7.01/.09	Special auxiliary subdivision for the arts
  7.01	Theory and philosophy of art. Principles of design, proportion, optical effect
  7.02	Art technique. Craftsmanship
  7.03	Artistic periods and phases. Schools, styles, influences
  7.04	Subjects for artistic representation. Iconography. Iconology
  7.05	Applications of art (in industry, trade, the home, everyday life)
  7.06	Various questions concerning art
  7.07	Occupations and activities associated with the arts and entertainment
  7.08	Characteristic features, forms, combinations etc. (in art, entertainment and sport)
  7.091	Performance, presentation (in original medium)
  71	Physical planning. Regional, town and country planning. Landscapes, parks, gardens
  72	Architecture
  73	Plastic arts
  74	Drawing. Design. Applied arts and crafts
  745/749	Industrial and domestic arts and crafts. Applied arts
  75	Painting
  76	Graphic art, printmaking. Graphics
  77	Photography and similar processes
  78	Music
  79	Recreation. Entertainment. Games. Sport
  791	Cinema. Films (motion pictures)
  792	Theatre. Stagecraft. Dramatic performances
  793	Social entertainments and recreations. Art of movement. Dance
  794	Board and table games (of thought, skill and chance)
  796	Sport. Games. Physical exercises
  797	Water sports. Aerial sports
  798	Riding and driving. Horse and other animal sports
  799	Sport fishing. Sport hunting. Shooting and target sports

8 Language. Linguistics. Literature

Tables for class 8 are fully faceted and details are expressed through combination with common auxiliaries of language (Table 1c) and a series of special auxiliary tables to indicate other facets or attributes in Linguistics or Literature. As a result, this class allows for great specificity in indexing although the schedules themselves occupy very little space in UDC. The subdivisions of e.g. 811 Languages or 821 Literature are derived from common auxiliaries of language =1/=9 (Table 1c) by substituting a point for the equals sign, e.g. 811.111 English language (as a subject of a linguistic study) and 821.111 English literature derives from =111 English language. Common auxiliaries of place and time are also frequently used in this class to express place and time facets of Linguistics or Literature, e.g. 821.111(71)"18" English literature of Canada in 19th century
  80	General questions relating to both linguistics and literature. Philology
  801	Prosody. Auxiliary sciences and sources of philology
  808	Rhetoric. The effective use of language  
  81	Linguistics and languages
  81`1/`4	Special auxiliary subdivision for subject fields and facets of linguistics and languages
  81`1	General linguistics
  81`2	Theory of signs. Theory of translation. Standardization. Usage. Geographical linguistics
  81`3	Mathematical and applied linguistics. Phonetics. Graphemics. Grammar. Semantics. Stylistics
  81`4	Text linguistics, Discourse analysis. Typological linguistics
  81`42	Text linguistics. Discourse analysis
  81`44	Typological linguistics
  811	Languages
        Derived from the common auxiliaries of language =1/=9 (Table 1c) by replacing the equal sign = with prefix 811. e.g. =111 English becomes 811.111 Linguistics of English language
  811.1/.9	All languages natural or artificial
  811.1/.8	Individual natural languages
  811.1/.2	Indo-European languages
  811.21/.22	Indo-Iranian languages
  811.3	Dead languages of unknown affiliation. Caucasian languages
  811.4	Afro-Asiatic, Nilo-Saharan, Congo-Kordofanian, Khoisan languages
  811.5	Ural-Altaic, Palaeo-Siberian, Eskimo-Aleut, Dravidian and Sino-Tibetan languages. Japanese. Korean. Ainu
  811.6	Austro-Asiatic languages. Austronesian languages
  811.7	Indo-Pacific (non-Austronesian) languages. Australian languages
  811.8	American indigenous languages
  811.9	Artificial languages
  82	Literature
  82-1/-9	Special auxiliary subdivision for literary forms, genres
  82-1	Poetry. Poems. Verse
  82-2	Drama. Plays
  82-3	Fiction. Prose narrative
  82-31	Novels. Full-length stories
  82-32	Short stories. Novellas
  82-4	Essays
  82-5	Oratory. Speeches
  82-6	Letters. Art of letter-writing. Correspondence. Genuine letters
  82-7	Prose satire. Humour, epigram, parody
  82-8	Miscellanea. Polygraphies. Selections
  82-9	Various other literary forms
  82-92	Periodical literature. Writings in serials, journals, reviews
  82-94	History as literary genre. Historical writing. Historiography. Chronicles. Annals. Memoirs
  82.02/.09	Special auxiliary subdivision for theory, study and technique of literature
  82.02	Literary schools, trends and movements
  82.09	Literary criticism. Literary studies
  82.091	Comparative literary studies. Comparative literature
  821	Literatures of individual languages and language families
        Derived from the common auxiliaries of language =1/=9 (Table 1c) by replacing the equal sign = with prefix 821. e.g. =111 English becomes 821.111 English literature

9 Geography. Biography. History

Tables for Geography and History in UDC are fully faceted and place, time and ethnic grouping facets are expressed through combination with common auxiliaries of place (Table 1d), ethnic grouping (Table 1f) and time (Table 1g)

  902/908	Archaeology. Prehistory. Cultural remains. Area studies
  902	Archaeology
  903	Prehistory. Prehistoric remains, artifacts, antiquities
  904	Cultural remains of historical times
  908	Area studies. Study of a locality
  91	Geography. Exploration of the Earth and of individual countries. Travel. Regional geography
  910	General questions. Geography as a science. Exploration. Travel
  911	General geography. Science of geographical factors (systematic geography). Theoretical geography
  911.2	Physical geography
  911.3	Human geography (cultural geography). Geography of cultural factors
  911.5/.9	Theoretical geography
  912	Nonliterary, nontextual representations of a region
  913	Regional geography
  92	Biographical studies. Genealogy. Heraldry. Flags
  929	Biographical studies
  929.5	Genealogy
  929.6	Heraldry
  929.7	Nobility. Titles. Peerage
  929.9	Flags. Standards. Banners
  93/94	History
  930	Science of history. Historiography
  930.1	History as a science
  930.2	Methodology of history. Ancillary historical sciences
  930.25	Archivistics. Archives (including public and other records)
  930.85	History of civilization. Cultural history
  94	General

Common auxiliary tables

Common auxiliaries of language. Table 1c
  =1/=9	Languages (natural and artificial)
  =1/=8	Natural languages
  =1/=2	Indo-European languages
  =1	Indo-European languages of Europe
  =11	Germanic languages
  =12	Italic languages
  =13	Romance languages
  =14	Greek (Hellenic)
  =15	Celtic languages
  =16	Slavic languages
  =17	Baltic languages
  =18	Albanian
  =19	Armenian
  =2	Indo-Iranian, Nuristani (Kafiri) and dead Indo-European languages
  =21/=22	Indo-Iranian languages
  =21	Indic languages
  =22	Iranian languages
  =29	Dead Indo-European languages (not listed elsewhere)
  =3	Dead languages of unknown affiliation. Caucasian languages
  =34	Dead languages of unknown affiliation, spoken in the Mediterranean and Near East (except Semitic)
  =35	Caucasian languages
  =4	Afro-Asiatic, Nilo-Saharan, Congo-Kordofanian, Khoisan languages
  =41	Afro-Asiatic (Hamito-Semitic) languages
  =42	Nilo-Saharan languages
  =43	Congo-Kordofanian (Niger-Kordofanian) languages
  =45	Khoisan languages
  =5	Ural-Altaic, Palaeo-Siberian, Eskimo-Aleut, Dravidian and Sino-Tibetan languages. Japanese. Korean. Ainu
  =51	Ural-Altaic languages
  =521	Japanese
  =531	Korean
  =541	Ainu
  =55	Palaeo-Siberian languages
  =56	Eskimo-Aleut languages
  =58	Sino-Tibetan languages
  =6	Austro-Asiatic languages. Austronesian languages
  =61	Austro-Asiatic languages
  =62	Austronesian languages
  =7	Indo-Pacific (non-Austronesian) languages. Australian languages
  =71	Indo-Pacific (non-Austronesian) languages
  =72	Australian languages
  =8	American indigenous languages
  =81	Indigenous languages of Canada, USA and Northern-Central Mexico
  =82	Indigenous languages of western North American Coast, Mexico and Yucatán
  =84/=88	Central and South American indigenous languages
  =84	Ge-Pano-Carib languages. Macro-Chibchan languages
  =85	Andean languages. Equatorial languages
  =86	Chaco languages. Patagonian and Fuegian languages
  =88	Isolated, unclassified Central and South American indigenous languages
  =9	Artificial languages
  =92	Artificial languages for use among human beings. International auxiliary languages (interlanguages)
  =93	Artificial languages used to instruct machines. Programming languages. Computer languages

(0...) Common auxiliaries of form. Table 1d
  (0.02/.08)	Special auxiliary subdivision for document form
  (0.02)	Documents according to physical, external form
  (0.03)	Documents according to method of production
  (0.032)	Handwritten documents (autograph, holograph copies). Manuscripts. Pictorial documents (drawings, paintings)
  (0.034)	Machine-readable documents
  (0.04)	Documents according to stage of production
  (0.05)	Documents for particular kinds of user
  (0.06)	Documents according to level of presentation and availability
  (0.07)	Supplementary matter issued with a document
  (0.08)	Separately issued supplements or parts of documents
  (01)	Bibliographies
  (02)	Books in general
  (03)	Reference works
  (04)	Non-serial separates. Separata
  (041)	Pamphlets. Brochures
  (042)	Addresses. Lectures. Speeches
  (043)	Theses. Dissertations
  (044)	Personal documents. Correspondence. Letters. Circulars
  (045)	Articles in serials, collections etc. Contributions
  (046)	Newspaper articles
  (047)	Reports. Notices. Bulletins
  (048)	Bibliographic descriptions. Abstracts. Summaries. Surveys
  (049)	Other non-serial separates
  (05)	Serial publications. Periodicals
  (06)	Documents relating to societies, associations, organizations
  (07)	Documents for instruction, teaching, study, training
  (08)	Collected and polygraphic works. Forms. Lists. Illustrations. Business publications
  (09)	Presentation in historical form. Legal and historical sources
  (091)	Presentation in chronological, historical form. Historical presentation in the strict sense
  (092)	Biographical presentation
  (093)	Historical sources
  (094)	Legal sources. Legal documents

(1/9) Common auxiliaries of place. Table 1e
  (1)	Place and space in general. Localization. Orientation
  (1-0/-9)	Special auxiliary subdivision for boundaries and spatial forms of various kinds
  (1-0)	Zones
  (1-1)	Orientation. Points of the compass. Relative position
  (1-11)	East. Eastern
  (1-13)	South. Southern
  (1-14)	South-west. South-western
  (1-15)	West. Western
  (1-17)	North. Northern
  (1-19)	Relative location, direction and orientation
  (1-2)	Lowest administrative units. Localities
  (1-5)	Dependent or semi-dependent territories
  (1-6)	States or groupings of states from various points of view
  (1-7)	Places and areas according to privacy, publicness and other special features
  (1-8)	Location. Source. Transit. Destination
  (1-9)	Regionalization according to specialized points of view
  (100)	Universal as to place. International. All countries in general
  (2)	Physiographic designation
  (20)	Ecosphere
  (21)	Surface of the Earth in general. Land areas in particular. Natural zones and regions
  (23)	Above sea level. Surface relief. Above ground generally. Mountains
  (24)	Below sea level. Underground. Subterranean
  (25)	Natural flat ground (at, above or below sea level). The ground in its natural condition, cultivated or inhabited
  (26)	Oceans, seas and interconnections
  (28)	Inland waters
  (29)	The world according to physiographic features
  (3)	Places of the ancient and mediaeval world
  (31)	Ancient China and Japan
  (32)	Ancient Egypt
  (33)	Ancient Roman Province of Judaea. The Holy Land. Region of the Israelites
  (34)	Ancient India
  (35)	Medo-Persia
  (36)	Regions of the so-called barbarians
  (37)	Italia. Ancient Rome and Italy
  (38)	Ancient Greece
  (39)   Catalan regions
  (399)	Other regions. Ancient geographical divisions other than those of classical antiquity
  (4/9)	Countries and places of the modern world
  (4)	Europe
  (5)	Asia
  (6)	Africa
  (7)	North and Central America
  (8)	South America
  (9)	States and regions of the South Pacific and Australia. Arctic. Antarctic

(=...) Common auxiliaries of human ancestry, ethnic grouping and nationality. Table 1f

They are derived mainly from the common auxiliaries of language =... (Table 1c) and so may also usefully distinguish linguistic-cultural groups, e.g. =111 English is used to represent (=111) English speaking peoples

  (=01)	Human ancestry groups
  (=011)	European Continental Ancestry Group
  (=012)	Asian Continental Ancestry Group
  (=013)	African Continental Ancestry Group
  (=014)	Oceanic Ancestry Group
  (=017)	American Native Continental Ancestry Group
  (=1/=8)	Linguistic-cultural groups, ethnic groups, peoples [derived from Table 1c]
  (=1:1/9)	Peoples associated with particular places
                e.g. (=111:71) Anglophone population of Canada

"..." Common auxiliaries of time. Table 1g
  "0/2"	Dates and ranges of time (CE or AD) in conventional Christian (Gregorian) reckoning
  "0"	First millennium CE
  "1"	Second millennium CE
  "2"	Third millennium CE
  "3/7"	Time divisions other than dates in Christian (Gregorian) reckoning
  "3"	Conventional time divisions and subdivisions: numbered, named, etc.
  "4"	Duration. Time-span. Period. Term. Ages and age-groups
  "5"	Periodicity. Frequency. Recurrence at specified intervals.
  "6"	Geological, archaeological and cultural time divisions
  "61/62" Geological time division
  "63"	Archaeological, prehistoric, protohistoric periods and ages
  "67/69" Time reckonings: universal, secular, non-Christian religious
  "67"	Universal time reckoning. Before Present
  "68"	Secular time reckonings other than universal and the Christian (Gregorian) calendar
  "69"	Dates and time units in non-Christian (non-Gregorian) religious time reckonings
  "7"	Phenomena in time. Phenomenology of time

-0 Common auxiliaries of general characteristics. Table 1k
  -02	Common auxiliaries of properties
  -021	Properties of existence
  -022	Properties of magnitude, degree, quantity, number, temporal values, dimension, size
  -023	Properties of shape
  -024	Properties of structure. Properties of position
  -025	Properties of arrangement
  -026	Properties of action and movement
  -027	Operational properties
  -028	Properties of style and presentation
  -029	Properties derived from other main classes
  -03 Common auxiliaries of materials
  -032	Naturally occurring mineral materials
  -033	Manufactured mineral-based materials
  -034	Metals
  -035	Materials of mainly organic origin
  -036	Macromolecular materials. Rubbers and plastics
  -037	Textiles. Fibres. Yarns. Fabrics. Cloth
  -039	Other materials
  -04 Common auxiliaries of relations, processes and operations
  -042	Phase relations
  -043	General processes
  -043.8/.9 Processes of existence
  -045	Processes related to position, arrangement, movement, physical properties, states of matter
  -047/-049	General operations and activities
  -05 Common auxiliaries of persons and personal characteristics
  -051	Persons as agents, doers, practitioners (studying, making, serving etc.)
  -052	Persons as targets, clients, users (studied, served etc.)
  -053	Persons according to age or age-groups
  -054	Persons according to ethnic characteristics, nationality, citizenship etc.
  -055	Persons according to gender and kinship
  -056	Persons according to constitution, health, disposition, hereditary or other traits
  -057	Persons according to occupation, work, livelihood, education
  -058	Persons according to social class, civil status

See also
Special classifications based on or used in combination with UDC
Universal Decimal Classification for Use in Polar Libraries - Scott Polar Research Institute, Cambridge 
BBC LonClass
Global Forest Decimal Classification

Other faceted classifications:
Bliss bibliographic classification
Colon classification
Broad System of Ordering

Other library classifications
Dewey Decimal Classification
Library of Congress Classification
 Russian Library-Bibliographical Classification (BBK) 
Chinese Library Classification
Harvard-Yenching Classification

References

External links

Universal Decimal Classification Consortium
About Universal Decimal Classification
Multilingual UDC Summary
UDC Linked Data

Belgian inventions
Controlled vocabularies
Decimal classification systems
Library cataloging and classification